Damba Badmaevich Ayusheev (born on September 1, 1962 in Bursomon, Krasnochikoysky District, Chita Oblast, USSR)—the XXIV Pandito Khambo Lama—a Head of the Buddhist Traditional Sangkha of Russia.

Biography 

In 1980 Damba Ayusheev graduated from Petrovsk-Zabaykalsky Pedagogical College, then he worked as a teacher at Kukursk secondary school in Agin-Buryat Autonomous Okrug.

By the assignment of Aginsky Datsan he entered Zanabazar Buddhist University in Ulan-Bator (Mongolia) in 1983 and graduated from it in 1988. Specialization — Tibetan Medicine.

As designated by the Central Spiritual Administration of Buddhists, during a year he was a curator of the USSR Soviet students studying at Buddhist University. Then he served as Amchi Lama at Ivolginsky datsan.

In 1991 he was appointed as Shireete Lama (abbot) at Baldan Breybun datsan in the settlement of Murochi, Kyakhtinsky district, the first datsan being at the stage of revival in the territory of ethnic Buryatia at that time. Under his leadership within two years the new Tsogchen dugan was rebuilt on the place of that demolished in the 1930s.

On April 28, 1995 Damba Ayusheev was elected on alternative basis as the XXIV Khambo lama, the Chairman of the Central Spiritual Administration of Buddhists of RF later renamed as the Buddhist Traditional Sangha of Russia.

During Damba Ayusheev's stay on this post, the datsan was re-erected in Verkhnyaya Berezovka (Ulan-Ude) as the second residence of Khambo Lama and two Buddhist Institutes (at Ivolginsky and Aginsky datsans) were opened where now Buryat, Mongolian and Tibetan teachers work, and new datsans and dugans were opened in the territory of ethnic Buryatia. Buddhism is recognized as one of four traditional confessions in Russia and international relations are widely developing.

Since August 2, 1995 Damba Ayusheev has been a member of the Council for Cooperation with Religious Associations under the Russian President.

Since December 23, 1998 he has been a member of the Presidium of Interreligious Council of Russia.

Since March 3, 2004 he has been a member of the Presidium of the Interreligious Council of the CIS countries.

Damba Ayusheev is Vice President of the Asian Buddhist Conference for Peace.

On June 4, 2011 by the Decree of the President of Mongolia, Damba Ayusheev was awarded the Order of the Polar Star for considerable contribution to strengthening the Russian-Mongolian relations. This award is the highest award of Mongolia for foreign citizens. The awarding has been made by Dambyn Darligjava, the Attorney General of Mongolia.

On June 17, 2011 Damba Ayusheev was awarded the medal of Kemerovo region “For Faith and Kindness” at Ivolginsky datsan. The awarding has been made by the representatives of Kemerovo regional administration.

On February 11, 2013 by the Decree of the President of Russia Vladimir Putin, Damba Ayusheev was awarded the Order of Friendship.

Religious views 
D. Amogolonova, a lead researcher of Institute for Mongolian, Buddhist and Tibetan Studies of the Siberian branch of RAS, notes that Damba Ayusheev has critical opinion on Buryat shamanism and the Russian Buddhist organizations non entering into the Buddhist Traditional Sangkha of Russia, and “does not mark the frontiers between confessions and considers everyone who believes in supreme forces by 60% (sic!) as a Buddhist”.

References

Printed sources
 

1962 births
Living people
20th-century Buddhist monks
21st-century Buddhist monks
20th-century lamas
21st-century lamas
Gelug Lamas
Members of the Civic Chamber of the Russian Federation
Presidents of religious organizations
Religious leaders in Russia
Russian Buddhist monks
People from Zabaykalsky Krai